

Events
Christoph Willibald Gluck is knighted by Pope Benedict XIV
Johann Christian Bach settles in Italy.

Published Popular Music
Mme Papavoine – Vous fuyez sans vouloir m'entendre (Paris)

Classical music
Johann Friedrich Agricola – 6 Canzonette
Carl Philipp Emanuel Bach 
La Bergius, H.90
La Borchward, H.79
La Gleim, H.89
La Pott, H.80
La Prinzette, H.91
 Anna Bon – 6 Flute Sonatas, Op. 1
Michel Corrette 
Troisième Livre d’Orgue
6 Organ Concertos, Op. 26
Baldassare Galuppi – 6 Harpsichord Sonatas, Op. 1
 Joseph Haydn – Keyboard Concerto No. 1 in C, Hob. XVIII/1
Marianus Königsperger – Præambulum cum fuga octavi toni
Julien-Amable Mathieu – 6 Trios, Op. 2
Leopold Mozart – Sinfonia di caccia
Giuseppe Antonio Paganelli - Ariae pro organo et cembalo
Giuseppe Sammartini – 8 Overtures in 7 Parts, Op. 10
 Elizabeth Turner – A Collection of Songs

Opera
Pasquale Cafaro – La disfatta di Dario
Baldassare Galuppi – Idomeneo
Pierre van Maldere – Le Déguisement pastorale
Jean-Philippe Rameau – Zoroastre
Antonio Sacchini – Fra Donato
John Christopher Smith – The Tempest

Publications
Johann Friedrich Daube – General-Bass in drey Accorden
Jacob Wilhelm Lustig – Samenspraaken over muzikaale Beginselen
Leopold Mozart – Versuch einer gründlichen Violinschule ("A Treatise on the Fundamental Principles of Violin Playing")
Jean-Philippe Rameau – Suite des Erreurs sur la musique dans l'Encyclopédie

Births
January 27 – Wolfgang Amadeus Mozart, Austrian composer (died 1791)
February 9 - Karel Blažej Kopřiva, Czech composer (died 1785)
March 21 – Augustus Frederic Christopher Kollmann, German composer (died 1829)
March 24 – Franziska Lebrun, composer and vocalist (died 1791)
 May 7 – Thomas Linley the younger, English composer (died 1778)
 June 20 – Joseph Martin Kraus, German-born composer (died 1792)
September 8 – Anton Teyber, composer and organist (died 1822)
 September 27 – Christoffer Christian Karsten, Swedish operatic tenor (died 1827)
 December 30 – Paul Wranitzky, Moravian-Austrian composer (died 1808)
date unknown – Joséphine-Rosalie de Walckiers, Dutch-Austrian composer (died 1836)

Deaths
 January 25 – Christian Vater, German organ and harpsichord builder (born 1679)
 April 10 – Giacomo Antonio Perti, Bolognese composer (born 1661)
 April 13 – Johann Gottlieb Goldberg, German keyboard virtuoso (born 1727)
 August 18 – Erdmann Neumeister, German hymnologist (born 1671)
 September 19 – Josef Antonín Sehling, Bohemian composter (born 1710)
date unknown – Riccardo Broschi, Italian-born composer (born c. 1698)

References

 
18th century in music
Music by year